The Twenty-second Dynasty of Egypt is also known as the Bubastite Dynasty, since the pharaohs originally ruled from the city of Bubastis. It was founded by Shoshenq I.
 
The Twenty-first, Twenty-second, Twenty-third, Twenty-fourth, and Twenty-fifth dynasties of ancient Egypt are often combined under the group designation of the Third Intermediate Period.

Rulers
The pharaohs of the Twenty-second Dynasty were a series of Meshwesh (ancient Libyan tribe) chieftains, who ruled from c. 943 BC until 716 BC. They had settled in Egypt since the Twentieth Dynasty and were known in Egypt as the 'Great Chiefs of the Ma' (Ma being a synonym of Meshwesh). Manetho states that this Egyptianized ancient Libyan dynasty first ruled over Bubastis, but its rulers almost certainly governed from Tanis, which was their capital and the city where their tombs have been excavated.
 
Another pharaoh who belongs to this group is Tutkheperre Shoshenq. His period of rule within this dynasty is currently uncertain, although he is now thought to have governed Egypt early in the 9th century BC for a short time between Osorkon I and Takelot I. The next ruler at Tanis after Shoshenq V was Osorkon IV. This pharaoh is sometimes not believed to be a member of the 22nd Dynasty since he only controlled a small portion of Lower Egypt together with Tefnakhte of Sais, whose authority was recognised at Memphis—and Iuput II of Leontopolis.

Pharaohs
The known rulers during the Twenty-second Dynasty include:

Twenty-Third Dynasty

The so-called Twenty-Third Dynasty was an offshoot of this dynasty perhaps based in Upper Egypt, though there is much debate concerning this issue. All of its kings reigned in Middle and Upper Egypt including the Western Desert Oases.

See also
 Twenty-second dynasty of Egypt Family Tree

References 

 
10th century BC in Egypt
10th century BC
10th-century BC establishments in Egypt
22
8th century BC in Egypt
8th-century BC disestablishments in Egypt
9th century BC in Egypt
Ancient Libya
Berber Egyptians
Berbers in Egypt
22
Nile Delta
States and territories disestablished in the 8th century BC
States and territories established in the 10th century BC
Tanis

de:Dritte Zwischenzeit (Ägypten)#22. Dynastie